Tonny van Haeren (23 September 1899 – 21 June 1976) was a Dutch footballer. He played in one match for the Netherlands national football team in 1926.

References

External links
 

1899 births
1976 deaths
Dutch footballers
Netherlands international footballers
Place of birth missing
Association footballers not categorized by position